This is a list of named geological features on asteroid 951 Gaspra.

Regiones

Gaspran regiones (geologically distinct areas) are named after astronomers and scientists closely associated with the asteroid.

See a labeled map here.

Craters

Gaspran craters are named after famous spa towns.

References

External links
 Gaspra nomenclature at the USGS planetary nomenclature web site

Gaspra